Lane Moore is an American stand-up comedian, author, writer, director, actor, singer, songwriter, and multi-instrumentalist living in New York, New York.

Career
She is a former writer for The Onion and The Onion Book of Known Knowledge: A Definitive Encyclopaedia Of Existing Information and regularly contributes to The New Yorker,  The Washington Post , and McSweeney's.

Brooklyn Based said Moore's comedy "deftly highlights the absurdity of everyday life, with just the right touch of self-deprecation" and addressed her multiple careers, saying, "Moore has, by her own count, 'like 35 careers,' and is jealousy-inducingly good at all of them." Vogue also praised Moore for being a polymath, calling her a "jack of all trades."

Paste named her Twitter one of "The 75 Best Twitter Accounts of 2014" and "The 75 Best Twitter Accounts of 2015," ranking it at #19 both times. Refinery 29 called Moore one of "The Female Stand-Up Comedians You Need To Know." Bust called Moore one of "10 Funny Ladies You Need To Be Watching" and Brooklyn Magazine called Moore one of "Brooklyn's Funniest 50 People." Bust also called her band It Was Romance the "Best Band of 2015" and Billboard named them one of "16 Lesbian & Queer Female-Fronted Bands You Should Know." Bustle named her one of the top comedians of 2017. Out Magazine named her one of the OUT100 of 2017, a list that celebrates compelling people who have had a hand in moving forward LGBT rights.

Moore was previously the Sex & Relationships Editor for Cosmopolitan, where she was the driving force in making the site more LGBTQ inclusive, which led to her winning a GLAAD Media Award in 2016. Moore has also written for Glamour, GQ, Elle, Esquire, and Marie Claire.

In late 2015, Moore created popular Tumblr blog Male Feminists of Tinder, which was immediately praised by numerous outlets including New York Magazine, which called it "brilliant...a perfect snapshot of a particular, awkward moment in culture and technology." Paper Magazine called it "the best Tumblr ever," BuzzFeed called it "a gift," and Cosmopolitan called it "hilarious...drop-dead funny."

In 2017, Moore created the Tumblr blog "Hotties of MTV's Next,"  where she posted contestant profiles she'd curated from the reality dating series Next. The page was praised by news outlets including The A.V. Club, which called it "a time machine that highlights an undocumented era when collars were popped, tips were frosted, and farting was its own kind of cultural currency." Cosmopolitan called the page "perfect" and Moore a "genius." Moore also appeared on @midnight for a segment based around the account, which Chris Hardwick called "amazing."

Tinder Live

Moore is the creator and host of Tinder Live, a stand-up comedy show where she uses the dating app Tinder and interacts with potential matches in real time. During the show, Moore projects Tinder profiles in front of an audience and panelists help her dissect profiles before swiping left (no) or right (yes). The comedy show, which began in late 2013, performs upon request at bars, comedy clubs, and colleges around the United States.

The New York Times described it as "truly addictive entertainment...ingenious. Moore transforms the banter on a dating app into compelling long-form improvisation. Ms. Moore, a cagey and humane performer, has developed an instinct for turning the raw materials of sexually charged chat with ordinary strangers into honed and generous jokes. 'Tinder Live' has a comic momentum and energy that is unusual. The way she manipulates tone and pace reveals an artist supremely confident in her form, not to mention a flirt par excellence."

Tinder Live was also called one of the best comedy shows in NYC by The New York Times, The Village Voice, Time Out, CBS, New York Magazine, Brooklyn Magazine, and HelloGiggles who noted the show "has all the addictive, fun qualities of a television game show. One of her show’s segments include going through Tinder profiles with the audience to come to a vote on whether to swipe left or right. This could be this generation’s version of The Dating Game."

Tinder Live has been praised for its positivity, with Vice saying, "Moore expertly steered the crowd from mean-heartedness to substance with each match." Brooklyn Based said, "In anyone else’s hands this show could feel mean-spirited, or perhaps like an invasion of privacy, but Moore makes it cathartic, a bracing comedic espresso shot."

Vulture listed Tinder Live in a guide to the best NYC comedy shows along with Assscat 3000, Whiplash, and the Comedy Cellar.

Television

She guest-starred on Season 5 of Girls.

Books

Moore published her first book How To Be Alone: If You Want To And Even If You Don't on November 8, 2018. It received coverage and praise from outlets including The New York Times, New York, NPR, Fast Company, and Marie Claire.

In summer 2019, Moore gave a TED Talk based on the book, also called How To Be Alone.

Music career

It Was Romance 

Moore is a vocalist, songwriter, and multi-instrumentalist who performs under the stage name It Was Romance, which Oxygen describes as a "high-energy rock band." Pitchfork listed her self-titled debut album as an album to watch and Bust magazine called It Was Romance the Best Band of 2015. The Village Voice premiered her first single, "Philadelphia," on their website, calling the song "mysterious but undeniably attractive. It evokes feelings of loneliness with a danceable beat, not unlike a somber nighttime walk home on wet roads, with colorful, joyous city lights reflecting like a black mirror" and praising the album for its "glittering instrumental aspect and Moore's velvety vocal delivery make the rest of "It Was Romance" saunter around like the life of the party, occasionally winking just to make sure you're hooked."

Paste Magazine described the sound as:
 "hearkening back to a Dig Me Out era Sleater Kinney, Moore’s expansive sound covers love and all its mishaps with a catchy, blast loud and sing proud thoughtfulness. Blending garage rock with soul and experimental undertones, It Was Romance...walks multiple genres with a deft grace to mirror Moore’s bubbly wit and eye-catching presence."

The Laugh Button praised Moore's voice, saying, "[Moore's] incredible voice, smoky and edgy and closely resembling the kind of stuff soulful grunge bands aspired to back in the 90s."

The music video for "Hooking Up With Girls" was released in late 2016 in Nylon (magazine). The video is a shot-for-shot remake of Fiona Apple's "Criminal" music video. Moore starred in and directed the music video, and Nylon (magazine) praised her for going "above and beyond to recreate the iconic video, searching for similar houses and costumes. Spoiler alert: She even added ’90s MTV title cards."

The video was featured on Entertainment Weekly, Billboard, Vogue, The Huffington Post, The Guardian, VICE, BUST Magazine, Refinery 29, and The Onion's AV Club, who said of the video "when [Moore] sings directly to the camera, it seems like an overly intimate confession." New York Magazine praised Moore for the video, adding, "It’s that weirdness that makes Moore so charming, and maybe the best homage to "Criminal" is one where the artist is unapologetically herself." The New York Observer said, "The classic shots are all there: Lane and Fiona both writhe in satin camisoles, looking up at the camera with bright, tear-red eyes; cowering in a closet with hair in twin braids, singing from a bathtub between a partner’s legs; and in that iconic opening, pointing a camera at the audience: the voyeur becoming the viewed. [And] goddammit this song is catchy."

In 2017, Moore started a music series at Arlene's Grocery called "90s Albums Live," with the first one being the Empire Records soundtrack which she and her band performed live.

Accolades
Moore won a 2016 GLAAD Media Award for Outstanding Magazine Overall Coverage for her groundbreaking work at Cosmopolitan. She was also nominated for a 2016 White House LGBT Champions of Change award. Out Magazine named her one of the OUT100 of 2017, a list that celebrates compelling people who have had a hand in moving forward LGBT rights.

References

External links

21st-century American comedians
21st-century American guitarists
21st-century American pianists
21st-century American screenwriters
21st-century American singers
21st-century American women guitarists
21st-century American women singers
21st-century American women writers
Alternative rock guitarists
Alternative rock pianists
Alternative rock singers
American alternative rock musicians
American comedy writers
American women rock singers
American women singer-songwriters
American pop pianists
American rock pianists
American rock singers
American rock songwriters
American stand-up comedians
American television writers
American women comedians
American women film directors
American women screenwriters
American women television writers
American television actresses
Bisexual musicians
Bisexual women
Comedians from New York City
Film directors from New York City
Guitarists from New York City
Bisexual comedians
American LGBT actors
Living people
Screenwriters from New York (state)
Singers from New York City
The Onion people
Writers from New York City
Year of birth missing (living people)
21st-century LGBT people
Singer-songwriters from New York (state)
21st-century women pianists
American LGBT comedians
American bisexual writers